Brewer is an unincorporated community and census-designated place in Saline Township, Perry County, Missouri, United States, which is located northwest of Perryville.

Demographics

History
Brewer was named for R. M. Brewer. The Brewer family, originally hailing from Maryland, had settled in Spencer County, Kentucky, before eventually coming to Missouri.

The town was unofficially known as Brewerville before the post office was christened Brewer in 1886.

References 

Census-designated places in Perry County, Missouri
Census-designated places in Missouri
Unincorporated communities in Perry County, Missouri
Unincorporated communities in Missouri